{{DISPLAYTITLE:C4H10O4}}
The molecular formula C4H10O4 (molar mass: 122.12 g/mol) may refer to:

 Erythritol, a sugar alcohol (or polyol) food additive
 Threitol, a four-carbon sugar alcohol; the diastereomer of erythritol

Molecular formulas